Matthew Harry McKiernan (born 14 June 1994) is an English cricketer. He made his Twenty20 debut for Derbyshire in the 2018 t20 Blast on 14 July 2018. He made his List A debut on 22 July 2021, for Derbyshire in the 2021 Royal London One-Day Cup. In April 2022, in the 2022 County Championship, McKiernan scored his maiden century in first-class cricket, with 101 against Leicestershire.

References

External links
 

1994 births
Living people
Cricketers from Merseyside
Cumberland cricketers
Derbyshire cricketers
English cricketers
People from Billinge, Merseyside